Voice of Ho Chi Minh City (VOH), more formally the Voice of Ho Chi Minh City's People is the official radio broadcasting station of Ho Chi Minh City. The station is located at 3 Nguyen Dinh Chieu Street, Dakao Ward, District 1, Ho Chi Minh City, Vietnam. Voice of Ho Chi Minh City is under the administration of Ho Chi Minh City Service of Culture and Communication and Ho Chi Minh City Communist Party Commission. The station broadcasts separate services on four frequencies:  AM 610 kHz, FM 99.9 MHz, FM 95.6 MHz and FM 87.7 MHz, both of which can be heard throughout Southern Vietnam, and furthermore the South Central Coast region in Central Vietnam.

Since 2019, several programmes on the frequencies of FM 95.6 MHz can be listened in Hanoi Capital Region in the FM frequency of 90.0 MHz, whereas programmes on the frequencies of 99.9 MHz can be listened under the FM 96.0 MHz frequencies.

Official website at https://voh.com.vn/

Mass media in Ho Chi Minh City
Radio stations in Vietnam